Lead sulfide refers to two compounds containing lead and sulfur:

Lead(II) sulfide, PbS, containing lead in the +2 oxidation state, naturally occurring as the mineral galena
Lead(IV) sulfide, PbS2, containing lead in the +4 oxidation state